Raymond W. Carpenter (born 1948) is a retired United States Army major general who served as acting Director of the Army National Guard.

Early life and education
Raymond W. Carpenter was born in Sturgis, South Dakota in 1948, and graduated from Sturgis Brown High School in 1966.

In 1967 he joined the South Dakota Army National Guard as a member of the 109th Engineer Battalion.

In 1975 Carpenter completed a Bachelor of Business Administration degree in Business at Black Hills State University.  He received a Master of Business Administration degree from the University of South Dakota in 1994.
Carpenter is a graduate of the Engineer Officer Basic and Advanced Courses, and the United States Army Command and General Staff College.  He is also a 1997 graduate of the United States Army War College.

Vietnam War
Carpenter transferred to the United States Navy, was trained as a Vietnamese linguist at the Defense Language Institute, and served at the Naval Support Facility in Da Nang Air Base, South Vietnam.

Post-Vietnam War
Upon returning to the United States, Carpenter continued his service in the South Dakota Army National Guard, receiving his commission as a second lieutenant of Engineers in 1974.  He carried out several assignments in the 842nd Engineer Company, and commanded the company from 1978 to 1982.

He continued to advance in positions of more rank and responsibility, including executive officer of Task Force Rushmore, a 5,000 soldier organization which was sent to Panama on a humanitarian mission in 1993 and built 27 kilometers of road while rebuilding 10 schools and 14 clinics. He then commanded the 109th Engineer Battalion from 1993 to 1995.

After serving as director of personnel and director of human resources for the South Dakota Army National Guard, Carpenter commanded the 109th Engineer Group from 1998 to 1999.

After serving as the South Dakota Army National Guard’s chief of staff from 2000 to 2003, Carpenter was promoted to brigadier general and assigned as the organization’s assistant adjutant general – Army.  From 2004 to 2006, Carpenter simultaneously served as deputy commander of the Maneuver Support Center at Fort Leonard Wood, Missouri.

National Guard Bureau
In April, 2006 Carpenter was assigned as special assistant to the director of the Army National Guard at the National Guard Bureau.  He was promoted to major general in December 2006.  In April, 2009 he was assigned as acting Deputy Director of the Army National Guard.

In May, 2009 Carpenter became acting Director of the Army National Guard, following the retirement of Clyde A. Vaughn.  Timothy J. Kadavy succeeded Carpenter as Deputy Director.

The United States Senate did not act on the nomination of the individual named to succeed Vaughn, Joseph Taluto, who retired in 2010.  As a result, Carpenter continued to serve as acting director until he retired in November 2011.  He was succeeded by William E. Ingram, Jr.

Awards and decorations

Other awards
Carpenter is a 1999 recipient of the Silver De Fleury Medal from the Army Engineer Association.  In 2012 he received the Raymond S. McLain Medal from the Association of the United States Army.

Chronological list of officer assignments
July 1974 - August 1974, Platoon Leader, Detachment 1, 842d Engineer Company, South Dakota Army National Guard, Belle Fourche, South Dakota
August 1974 - October 1974, Student, Engineer School, Engineer Officer Basic Course, Fort Belvoir, Virginia
October 1974 - June 1976, Platoon Leader, Detachment 1, 842d Engineer Company, South Dakota Army National Guard, Belle Fourche, South Dakota
July 1976 - October 1978, Platoon Leader, Detachment 3, 842d Engineer Company, South Dakota Army National Guard, Deadwood, South Dakota
November 1978 - July 1982, Company Commander, 842d Engineer Company, South Dakota Army National Guard, Spearfish, South Dakota
August 1982 - April 1985, S-4, Headquarters, Headquarters Detachment, 109th Engineer Battalion, South Dakota Army National Guard, Sturgis, South Dakota
April 1985 - July 1986, Executive Officer, Headquarters, Headquarters Detachment, 109th Engineer Battalion, South Dakota Army National Guard, Sturgis, South Dakota
August 1986 - August 1987, S-3, Headquarters, Headquarters Detachment, 109th Engineer Battalion, South Dakota Army National Guard, Sturgis, South Dakota
September 1987 - December 1989, Executive Officer, Headquarters, Headquarters Detachment, 109th Engineer Battalion, South Dakota Army National Guard, Sturgis, South Dakota
January 1990 - August 1991, Chief Internal Review, Headquarters, State Area Command, South Dakota Army National Guard, Rapid City, South Dakota
August 1991 - September 1993, Facilities Management Officer, Headquarters, State Area Command, South Dakota Army National Guard, Rapid City, South Dakota
September 1993 - June 1995, Battalion Commander, Headquarters, Headquarters Detachment, 109th Engineer Battalion, South Dakota Army National Guard, Sturgis, South Dakota
July 1995 - June 1996, Director of Personnel, Headquarters, State Area Command, South Dakota Army National Guard, Rapid City, South Dakota
June 1996 - June 1997, Student, United States Army War College, Carlisle Barracks, Pennsylvania
June 1997 - May 1998, Director of Human Resources, Headquarters, State Area Command, South Dakota Army National Guard Rapid City, South Dakota
May 1998 - June 1999, Group Commander, Headquarters, Headquarters Company, 109th Engineer Group, South Dakota Army National Guard, Rapid City, South Dakota
July 1999 - January 2000, Director of Plans, Operations and Training, Headquarters State Area Command, South Dakota National Guard, Rapid City, South Dakota
February 2000 - March 2003, Chief of Staff, Headquarters, State Area Command, South Dakota Army National Guard, Rapid City, South Dakota
April 2003 - April 2006, Assistant Adjutant General, South Dakota Army National Guard, Rapid City, South Dakota
September 2004 - April 2006, Dual-hatted as the Deputy Commanding General, Maneuver Support Center, Fort Leonard Wood, Missouri
April 2006 - April 2009, Special Assistant to the Director of the Army National Guard, National Guard Bureau, Arlington, Virginia
April 2009 - May 2009, Acting Deputy Director, Army National Guard, National Guard Bureau, Arlington, Virginia
May 2009 - November 2011, Acting Director, Army National Guard, National Guard Bureau, Arlington, Virginia

Effective dates of promotions
Major General, December 9, 2006
Brigadier General, April 1, 2003
Colonel, July 1, 1995
Lieutenant Colonel, October 1, 1990
Major, April 26, 1985
Captain, July 28, 1979
First Lieutenant, July 28, 1977
Second Lieutenant, July 29, 1974

References

External resources
Raymond W. Carpenter at National Guard Bureau General Officer Management Office

Living people
1948 births
People from Rapid City, South Dakota
United States Army personnel of the Vietnam War
Black Hills State University alumni
University of South Dakota alumni
United States Army Command and General Staff College alumni
United States Army War College alumni
Recipients of the Distinguished Service Medal (US Army)
Recipients of the Legion of Merit
United States Army generals
National Guard (United States) generals
People from Sturgis, South Dakota
United States Navy sailors